Brazilian Nights is the seventeenth studio album by Kenny G, released on January 27, 2015, his second bossa nova album, following Rhythm & Romance released in 2008, and his first studio album since Heart and Soul (2010).

Background
Kenny G had his inspiration for the album when he was touring and traveling in Brazil, especially in Rio de Janeiro. Explaining this, he said that he loved the Bossa nova genre, the people in Brazil and the nights of dancing and singing. He decided to take the Bossa nova sounds into his new album. The album's deluxe edition also contains 4 live versions of Kenny G's biggest hits, such as "Forever in Love" and "Heart and Soul".

Track listing

Personnel 
 Kenny G – alto saxophone (1, 2, 5, 8), soprano saxophone (3, 10), tenor saxophone (4, 6, 7, 9), arrangements
 Walter Afanasieff – pianos, synthesizers, drum and percussion programming, arrangements, orchestra arrangements
 Sam Hirsh – acoustic piano (5)
 Jorge Calandrelli – orchestra arrangements

Production 
 Producers – Kenny G and Walter Afanasieff
 Engineer – Gordon Lyon
 Additional Engineering – Adam Bradford, Martin Nessi and Steven Shepherd.
 Mixed by Humberto Gatica
 Mastered by Stephen Marcussen at Marcussen Mastering (Hollywood, CA).
 Art Direction – Todd Gallopo
 Design – Todd Gallopo and Jan Montgomery
 Photography – Chapman Baehler

Chart performance
The album brought Kenny G back to the Billboard 200 after 5 years. It's also Kenny's eighth No.1 album in the Billboard Jazz Albums.

References

2015 albums
Kenny G albums
Albums produced by Walter Afanasieff
Concord Records albums